George Grey (born July 22, 1979, in Sidcup, England) is a Canadian cross-country skier.

Grey made his World Cup debut in 2001, with his best finish coming in early 2009, when he teamed with Alex Harvey to win a bronze medal in the team sprint. His best individual performance thus far is 16th place, which he achieved at Canmore in 2005 and at Davos in 2008. He also had a ninth-place finish in the prologue of the 2008-09 Tour de Ski.

Grey had a pair of top 10 finishes at the 2009 Nordic World Ski Championships, ending up fifth in the 4 × 10 km relay and ninth in the team sprint.

Competing in two Winter Olympics, Grey earned his best finish of seventh in the 4 × 10 km relay at Vancouver in 2010 and had his best individual finish of eighth in the 30 km pursuit at those same games.

Cross-country skiing results
All results are sourced from the International Ski Federation (FIS).

Olympic Games

World Championships

World Cup

Season standings

Team podiums
 1 podium – (1 )

References

External links

1979 births
Canadian male cross-country skiers
Cross-country skiers at the 2006 Winter Olympics
Cross-country skiers at the 2010 Winter Olympics
Living people
Olympic cross-country skiers of Canada
People from Sidcup